Ağkənd is a village in the Zangilan District of Azerbaijan. The name means "white village" in the Azerbaijani language.

References 

Populated places in Zangilan District